A diesel–electric transmission, or diesel–electric powertrain is a transmission system for vehicles powered by diesel engines in road, rail, and marine transport. Diesel–electric transmission is based on petrol–electric transmission, a very similar transmission system used for petrol engines.

Diesel–electric transmission is used on railways by diesel–electric locomotives and diesel–electric multiple units, as electric motors are able to supply full torque at 0 RPM. Diesel–electric systems are also used in marine transport, including submarines, and on some land vehicles.

Description 

The defining characteristic of diesel–electric transmission is that it avoids the need for a gearbox, by converting the mechanical force of the diesel engine into electrical energy (through an alternator), and using the electrical energy to drive traction motors, which propel the vehicle mechanically. The traction motors may be powered directly or via rechargeable batteries, making the vehicle a type of hybrid electric vehicle. This method of transmission is sometimes termed electric transmission, as it is identical to petrol-electric transmission, which is used on vehicles powered by petrol engines, and to turbine-electric transmission, which is used for gas turbines.

Advantages and disadvantages 

Diesel Electric transmissions are a type of Continuously variable transmission.
The absence of a gearbox offers several advantages, as it removes the need for gear changes, thus eliminating the unevenness of acceleration caused by the disengagement of a clutch.

Ships

The first diesel motorship was also the first diesel–electric ship, the Russian tanker Vandal from Branobel, which was launched in 1903. Steam turbine–electric propulsion has been in use since the 1920s (s), using diesel–electric powerplants in surface ships has increased lately. The Finnish coastal defence ships Ilmarinen and Väinämöinen laid down in 1928–1929, were among the first surface ships to use diesel–electric transmission. Later, the technology was used in diesel powered icebreakers.

In World War II, the United States Navy built diesel–electric surface warships. The s, on the other hand, were designed for diesel–electric propulsion because of its flexibility and resistance to damage.

Some modern diesel–electric ships, including cruise ships and icebreakers, use electric motors in pods called azimuth thrusters underneath to allow for 360° rotation, making the ships far more maneuverable. An example of this is Symphony of the Seas, the largest passenger ship as of 2019.

Gas turbines are also used for electrical power generation and some ships use a combination: Queen Mary 2 has a set of diesel engines in the bottom of the ship plus two gas turbines mounted near the main funnel; all are used for generating electrical power, including those used to drive the propellers. This provides a relatively simple way to use the high-speed, low-torque output of a turbine to drive a low-speed propeller, without the need for excessive reduction gearing.

Submarines

Most early submarines used a direct mechanical connection between the combustion engine and propeller, switching between diesel engines for surface running and electric motors for submerged propulsion. This was effectively a "parallel" type of hybrid, since the motor and engine were coupled to the same shaft. On the surface, the motor (driven by the engine) was used as a generator to recharge the batteries and supply other electric loads. The engine would be disconnected for submerged operation, with batteries powering the electric motor and supplying all other power as well.

In a true diesel–electric transmission arrangement, by contrast, the propeller or propellers are always driven directly or through reduction gears by one or more electric motors, while one or more diesel generators provide electric energy for charging the batteries and driving the motors. While this solution comes with a few disadvantages compared to direct mechanical connection between the diesel engine and the propeller that was initially common, the advantages were eventually found to be more important. One of several significant advantages is that it mechanically isolates the noisy engine compartment from the outer pressure hull and reduces the acoustic signature of the submarine when surfaced. Some nuclear submarines also use a similar turbo-electric propulsion system, with propulsion turbo generators driven by reactor plant steam.

Among the pioneering users of true diesel–electric transmission was the Swedish Navy with its first submarine, HMS Hajen (later renamed Ub no 1), launched in 1904 and originally equipped with a semi-diesel engine (a hot-bulb engine primarily meant to be fueled by kerosene), later replaced by a true diesel. From 1909 to 1916, the Swedish Navy launched another seven submarines in three different classes (2nd class, Laxen class, and Braxen class), all using diesel–electric transmission. While Sweden temporarily abandoned diesel–electric transmission as it started to buy submarine designs from abroad in the mid 1910s, the technology was immediately reintroduced when Sweden began to design its own submarines again in the mid 1930s. From that point onwards, diesel–electric transmission has been consistently used for all new classes of Swedish submarines, albeit supplemented by air-independent propulsion (AIP) as provided by Stirling engines beginning with HMS Näcken in 1988.

Another early adopter of diesel–electric transmission was the United States Navy, whose Bureau of Steam Engineering proposed its use in 1928. From that point onwards, it continued to be used on most US conventional submarines.

Apart from the British U-class and some submarines of the Imperial Japanese Navy that used separate diesel generators for low speed running, few navies other than those of Sweden and the US made much use of diesel–electric transmission before 1945. After World War II, by contrast, it gradually became the dominant mode of propulsion for conventional submarines. However, its adoption was not always swift. Notably, the Soviet Navy did not introduce diesel–electric transmission on its conventional submarines until 1980 with its Paltus class.

Railway locomotives

During World War I, there was a strategic need for rail engines without plumes of smoke above them. Diesel technology was not yet sufficiently developed but a few precursor attempts were made, especially for petrol–electric transmissions by the French (Crochat-Collardeau, patent dated 1912 also used for tanks and trucks) and British (Dick, Kerr & Co and British Westinghouse). About 300 of these locomotives, only 96 being standard gauge, were in use at various points in the conflict.

In the 1920s, diesel–electric technology first saw limited use in switchers (or shunters), locomotives used for moving trains around in railroad yards and assembling and disassembling them. An early company offering "Oil-Electric" locomotives was the American Locomotive Company (ALCO). The ALCO HH series of diesel–electric switcher entered series production in 1931. In the 1930s, the system was adapted for streamliners, the fastest trains of their day. Diesel–electric powerplants became popular because they greatly simplified the way motive power was transmitted to the wheels and because they were both more efficient and had greatly reduced maintenance requirements. Direct-drive transmissions can become very complex, considering that a typical locomotive has four or more axles. Additionally, a direct-drive diesel locomotive would require an impractical number of gears to keep the engine within its powerband; coupling the diesel to a generator eliminates this problem. An alternative is to use a torque converter or fluid coupling in a direct drive system to replace the gearbox. Hydraulic transmissions are claimed to be somewhat more efficient than diesel–electric technology.

Road and other land vehicles

Buses

Diesel electric based buses have also been produced, including hybrid systems able to run on and store electrical power in batteries. The two main providers of hybrid systems for diesel–electric transit buses include Allison Transmission and BAE Systems. New Flyer Industries, Gillig Corporation, and North American Bus Industries are major customers for the Allison EP hybrid systems, while Orion Bus Industries and Nova Bus are major customer for the BAE HybriDrive system. Mercedes-Benz makes their own diesel–electric drive system, which is used in their Citaro. The only bus that runs on single diesel-electric transmission is the Mercedes Benz Cito low floor concept bus which was introduced in 1998.

Trucks

Examples include:
 Large mining machines, such as the Liebherr T 282B dump truck or LeTourneau L-2350 wheel loader.
NASA's Crawler-Transporters.
Mitsubishi Fuso Canter Eco Hybrid commercial truck.
International DuraStar Hybrid diesel–electric truck.
Dodge is conducting fleet tests of a diesel–electric version of the Dodge Sprinter.
Hyllion Inc. is modifying some semi trucks to run on its 6X4HE Class 8 diesel electric hybrid system.

Concept Vehicles

In the automobile industry, diesel engines in combination with electric transmissions and battery power are being developed for future vehicle drive systems. Partnership for a New Generation of Vehicles was a cooperative research program between the U.S. government and "The Big Three" automobile manufacturers (DaimlerChrysler, Ford and General Motors) that developed diesel hybrid cars.

"Third-Millennium Cruiser", an attempt to commercialize a diesel–electric automobile in the early 1980s.
General Motors Precept
Ford Prodigy
Dodge Intrepid ESX
Ford Reflex is a diesel hybrid concept car.
Zytek developed a diesel hybrid powertrain.
Peugeot 307 Hybrid HDi
Citroën C-Cactus
Opel Flextreme
Top Gear Hammerhead-i Eagle Thrust
Rivian Automotive was developing a diesel–electric engine that should achieve an estimated 90 miles per U.S. gallon (2.61 L/100 km) in the city and over 100 miles per U.S. gallon (2.35 L/100 km) on the highway.

Military vehicles
Diesel–electric propulsion has been tried on some military vehicles, such as tanks. The prototype TOG1 and TOG2 super heavy tanks of the Second World War used twin generators driven by V12 diesel engines.  More recent prototypes include the SEP modular armoured vehicle and T95e. Future tanks may use diesel–electric drives to improve fuel efficiency while reducing the size, weight and noise of the power plant. Attempts with diesel–electric drives on wheeled military vehicles include the unsuccessful ACEC Cobra, MGV, and XM1219 Armed Robotic Vehicle.

See also 
 DC distribution system (ship propulsion)
 Petrol-electric transmission
 Turbine-electric transmission
 Turbo-electric transmission

References

External links

EERE Clean Fleet Guide by vehicle type
Hybrid-Vehicle.org: Information on hybrid vehicle history, technology and practical application in a broad spectrum of vehicles 
Diesel Hybrid News

Diesel engine technology
Marine propulsion
Diesel engines
Swedish inventions
Diesel-electric vehicles
Automotive transmission technologies